"Restless Heart" is a song by US singer Peter Cetera, written by Cetera along with Andy Hill and released from the album World Falling Down in 1992. "Restless Heart" was Cetera's final of five number-one hits on the US Adult Contemporary chart, spending two weeks at the top. It was also his final top-forty hit on the Billboard Hot 100 chart, peaking at number 35.

Track listing
Maxi-CD
 "Restless Heart" – 4:09
 "Dip Your Wings" – 3:32
 "One Good Woman" – 4:34

Personnel 
 Peter Cetera – lead vocals
 Andy Hill – all instruments
 Janey Clewer – backing vocals 
 Edie Lehmann – backing vocals 
 Bobbie Page – backing vocals

Charts

Weekly charts

Year-end charts

See also
List of Hot Adult Contemporary number ones of 1992

References

1992 singles
1992 songs
Peter Cetera songs
Songs written by Andy Hill (composer)
Songs written by Peter Cetera
Warner Records singles